Trevenen is a hamlet on the A394 main road from Helston to Mabe in west Cornwall, England, United Kingdom. It is south of Wendron.

See also

Trevenen Bal

References

Hamlets in Cornwall